King of Arms is the senior rank of an officer of arms.  In many heraldic traditions, only a king of arms has the authority to grant armorial bearings and sometimes certify genealogies and noble titles. In other traditions, the power has been delegated to other officers of similar rank.

Heraldic duties

In England, the authority to grant a coat of arms is subject to the formal approval of the Earl Marshal in the form of a warrant.  In jurisdictions such as the Republic of Ireland the authority to grant armorial bearings has been delegated to a chief herald that serves the same purpose as the traditional king of arms. Canada also has a chief herald, though this officer grants arms on the authority of the Governor General as the Queen's representative through the Herald Chancellor's direct remit.  Scotland's only king of arms, the Lord Lyon, exercises the royal prerogative by direct delegation from the Crown and like the Chief Herald of Ireland and the old Ulster King of Arms needs no warrant from any other office bearer.

In the Kingdom of Spain, the power to certify coats of arms has been given to the Cronistas de Armas (Chroniclers of Arms).

The English and Scottish kings of arms are the only officers of arms to have a distinctive crown 
of office, used for ceremonial purposes such as at coronations (as opposed to peers, who instead wear a coronet).  At the coronation of Queen Elizabeth II, the kings of arms used a crown trimmed with sixteen acanthus leaves alternating in height, and inscribed with the words Miserere mei Deus secundum magnam misericordiam tuam (Have mercy upon me, O God, according to Thy great mercy; Psalm 51). When this crown is shown in pictorial representations, nine leaves and the first three words are shown.  Recently, a new crown has been made for the Lord Lyon, modelled on the Scottish Royal crown among the Honours of Scotland. This crown has removable arches (like one of the late Queen Mother's crowns) which will be removed at coronations to avoid any hint of lèse majesté.

Kings of arms and heraldic authorities of the United Kingdom

Kings of arms of England, Wales and Northern Ireland
Garter Principal King of Arms
Clarenceux King of Arms (England and Wales south of the Trent)
Norroy and Ulster King of Arms (England north of the Trent and Northern Ireland)

Scottish King of Arms
Lord Lyon King of Arms

Orders of chivalry
Garter King of Arms is the herald of the Order of the Garter as is in Scotland Lord Lyon King of Arms the herald of the Order of the Thistle. The Norroy and Ulster King of Arms is the herald of the (now dormant) Order of St Patrick. Other British orders of chivalry have their own kings of arms:
 Bath King of Arms, for the Order of the Bath
 King of Arms of the Order of St Michael and St George
 King of Arms of the Order of the British Empire

Chief or state heralds of Ireland and the Commonwealth
The Chief Herald of Canada
The Chief Herald of Ireland
The National Herald (formerly State Herald) of South Africa
New Zealand Herald of Arms Extraordinary The Herald of Arms of New Zealand

State Herald of Sweden
The State Herald (Statsheraldiker) of Sweden is the head of a branch of the National Archives of Sweden

Cronistas de Armas of Spain

Cronistas Reyes de Armas

Former kings of arms of Portugal
 Rei de Armas Portugal or Portugal Rei de Armas (Portugal King of Arms)
 Rei de Armas Algarve (Algarve King of Arms)
 Rei de Armas Índia (India King of Arms)

King of Arms of the Royal House of Bourbon Two Sicilies
 King of Arms Royal House of Bourbon Two Sicilies (Fernando Muñoz Altea, first appointed by the Prince Ranieri, Duke of Castro)

See also
 Bureau of Heraldry
 Canadian Heraldic Authority
 College of Arms
 Court of the Lord Lyon
 Grant of arms
 Heraldic authority

References

External links

The Court of the Lord Lyon
The College of Arms

The Office of the Chief Herald of Ireland
 Genealogy & Heraldry Bill, 2006  - new legislation on heraldry before the Irish Senate
King of Arms Royal House of Bourbon Two Sicilies (Appointed by the Duke of Castro)

Officers of arms
Government occupations
Positions of authority